Apitoxin or bee venom is the venom produced by the honey bee. It is a cytotoxic and hemotoxic bitter colorless liquid containing proteins, which may produce local inflammation.  It may have similarities to sea nettle toxin.

Components
Bee venom is a complex mixture of proteins and smaller molecules.

The main component is melittin, which amounts to 52% of venom peptides One of the main allergens is phospholipase A2, which amounts to 12% and is an enzyme that catalyzes the hydrolysis of phospholipids, causing degradation of cell membranes. Adolapin contributes 2–5% of the peptides. Further protein components include apamin (2%), a neurotoxin, hyaluronidase (2%), which dilates blood vessels, increasing their permeability and facilitating the spread of the venom, mast cell degranulating peptide (2%), tertiapin, and secapin. Small molecules in bee venom include histamine (0.1–1%), dopamine and noradrenaline.

Research
Apitoxins are under preliminary research for their potential biological effects, such as in cancer.

See also 
 Apitherapy
 Bee sting
 Beekeeping
 Hive management
 Honeybee
 Wasp venoms

References

External links 

Bee products
Beekeeping
Insect toxins